YWLA may refer to:
 Young Workers League of America (YWL), now Young Communist League USA
 Young Women's Leadership Academy (disambiguation), a name used by several public all-girls' schools in Texas.